Bilston East is a ward of Wolverhampton City Council, West Midlands. It covers the southern and eastern parts of the town of Bilston, as well as Bradley. It borders the Spring Vale, Ettingshall, and Bilston North wards, as well as the Metropolitan Boroughs of Walsall, Sandwell, and Dudley. It forms part of the Wolverhampton South East constituency.

Bilstons town centre, market, and West Midlands Metro station all lie in the ward.

Wards of Wolverhampton City Council